Sanskritirani Desai is Gujarati poet from India.

Life
Sanskritirani was born in Baroda (now Vadodara) on 1 October 1958 to Sudhir Desai and Tarini Desai who were Gujarati writers. Her sister Dhvani Desai is also poet and filmmaker. She studied for an M. A. in Statistics, M. B. A. in Finance and Diploma in Management Studies. She works as the General Manager in the Information Technology Department of a Public Limited Company. She knows Gujarati, Hindi, English, Marathi, Bengali, Sanskrit and Russian languages. She is a painter, swimmer, dancer as well as karateka.

Works
Her first poetry collection Suryo Ja Suryo (1993) included unique modern poems on the sun and its different forms. It received critical acclaim. Sapna Vatemarguo is her other poetry collection. She has translated several poems from Russian into Gujarati and English.

Awards
Her Suryo Ja Suryo received several awards such as Takhtasinh Parmar Prize (1992-93) and Phanishwarnath Renu Sahitya Award. She has also received two prizes from Gujarati Sahitya Parishad, Gira Gurjari Award, Dinkar Shah Kavi 'Jay' Prize.

See also
 List of Gujarati-language writers

References 

1958 births
Living people
Indian women poets
Writers from Mumbai
20th-century Indian women writers
20th-century Indian poets
Women writers from Maharashtra
People from Vadodara